Anastasija Sevastova was the defending champion, having won the event in 2012, but chose not to defend her title.

Barbora Záhlavová-Strýcová won the title, defeating Karin Knapp in the final, 6–2, 6–4.

Seeds

Main draw

Finals

Top half

Bottom half

References 
 Main draw

Empire Slovak Open - Singles